Gheorghe Cornel Cacoveanu (16 September 1935 – 23 November 2001) was a Romanian footballer who played as an attacking midfielder, most notably for Steaua București.

Career 
His debut for Metalul Câmpia Turzii came in 1951. He promoted in the Romanian first division with his team and played well in Divizia A. He moved to Bucharest in 1955 playing only a season for Progresul București before moving to Steaua București. He played nine years for this team, being a part of Steaua's Gold Team. At his end of career, he played for Dinamo Piteşti, Minerul Baia Mare and his last team, the obscure third division club Tehnometal.

Honours

Club

Steaua București
Romanian League (3):  1956, 1960, 1961
Romanian Cup (1): 1962

References

External links
 Profile  at Steauafc.com 
 

1935 births
2001 deaths
People from Ocna Mureș
Romanian footballers
Romania international footballers
Liga I players
CSM Câmpia Turzii players
FC Progresul București players
FC Steaua București players
CS Minaur Baia Mare (football) players
FC Argeș Pitești players
Association football midfielders